Cabinet is a populated place located in Bonner County, Idaho, United States.

Population 

Its population is 1,137 with 1,085 (95.43%) White, 3 (0.26%) of Black, 19 (1.67%) Hispanic, 3 (0.26%) Asian, 14 (1.23%) Indian, and 4 (0.35%) other. There are 569 males and 568 females and a total of 592 households averaging 2.34 people per household. The average home value is $81,600 and the average income is $23,510.

References

Populated places in Idaho